James Neil Atkinson (January 10, 1929 – July 31, 2010) was an American bobsledder who competed in the early 1950s. He won a silver medal in the four-man event at the 1952 Winter Olympics in Oslo.

Atkinson also won two medals in the four-man event at the FIBT World Championships with one gold (1950) and one silver (1951).

References
Bobsleigh four-man Olympic medalists for 1924, 1932-56, and since 1964

American male bobsledders
Bobsledders at the 1952 Winter Olympics
1929 births
2010 deaths
Medalists at the 1952 Winter Olympics
Olympic silver medalists for the United States in bobsleigh
20th-century American people